Panyalam or panyam, is a traditional Filipino-Bangsamoro fried rice pancake. It is made with ground glutinous rice, muscovado (or brown sugar), and coconut milk mixed into a batter that is deep-fried.

Panyalam originates from Mindanao and nearby islands. It is particularly popular among Muslim Filipinos, including among the Maguindanao, Maranao, Sama-Bajau, and Tausug people. It is commonly served during special occasions and religious holidays (notably during Hari Raya). It is also a traditional dish among native Christian and animist Lumad groups, like the Mansaka and non-Islamized communities of the Sama-Bajau.

See also
 Kue pinyaram
 Kuzhi paniyaram
Tupig
Bibingka
Kakanin
Kumukunsi
List of pancakes
Lokot-lokot
Okoy
Palitaw
Pastil
Puto
Shakoy

References

Philippine desserts
Philippine rice dishes
Doughnuts
Foods containing coconut
Pancakes
Rice cakes